Spark in the Dark is the second album by the rock band The Alpha Band, released in 1977. The core band members remained T-Bone Burnett, Steven Soles and David Mansfield. No less than five drummers were used on the recording, including guest Ringo Starr.

Track listing

Side 1

 "East of East" (T-Bone Burnett, Bob Neuwirth, Steven Soles)
 "Born in Captivity" (Arthur Buster Stahr)
 "Blue Lonely Night" (Soles)
 "Silver Mantis" (Burnett, John Fleming)
 "Honey Run" (K. O. Thomas)

Side 2

 "Adrenalin" (Burnett, Soles, Jim Ganzer)
 "You Angel You" (Bob Dylan)
 "Not Everything Has a Price" (Burnett, Soles)
 "Love and Romance" (Soles)
 "Mystified" (Burnett)
 "Spark in the Dark (On the Moody Existentialist)" (Burnett)
 "Jazz Hymn" (W. M. Ham)

Personnel
T-Bone Burnett – vocals, guitar, piano
David Mansfield – guitar, mandolin, violin, dobro, pedal steel guitar, percussion, cello, viola, violin
Steven Soles – vocals, guitar, piano
David Miner – bass
Matt Betton – drums
Bill Maxwell – drums
Joe Correro – drums
Geoffrey Hales – drums
Ringo Starr – drums ("Born in Captivity" and "You Angel You")
K.O. Thomas – keyboards
Mike Utley – keyboards
Osamu Kitajima – koto
Cindy Bullens – background vocals

References

1977 albums
Arista Records albums
The Alpha Band albums